Kurgan is a rural locality (a selo) in Kurgansky Selsoviet of Svobodnensky District, Amur Oblast, Russia. The population was 54 as of 2018. There are 8 streets.

Geography 
Kurgan is located on the left bank of the Bolshaya Pera River, 51 km north of Svobodny (the district's administrative centre) by road. Ledyanaya is the nearest rural locality.

References 

Rural localities in Svobodnensky District